Wang Zheng (born April 28, 1979 in Jiangsu) is a male Chinese sports shooter. He competed in the 2004 Summer Olympics.

He won the bronze medal in the men's double trap competition.

Wang became part of the Chinese national shooting team in 2001.

External links
 DatabaseOlympic.com page
 Chinese Olympic Committee page

1979 births
Living people
Chinese male sport shooters
Olympic bronze medalists for China
Olympic shooters of China
Sport shooters from Jiangsu
Shooters at the 2004 Summer Olympics
Trap and double trap shooters
Olympic medalists in shooting
Medalists at the 2004 Summer Olympics
21st-century Chinese people